Alberto A. Arias (born October 14, 1983) is a Dominican former professional baseball pitcher.

In , Arias played in Minor League Baseball with the Tulsa Drillers. On July 31, 2008, the Houston Astros claimed him off waivers from the Rockies and assigned him to Triple-A Round Rock.

In 2009, Arias took a big step forward in his career, setting career-best marks in games played (42), innings pitched (45.2), WHIP (1.489) and ERA (3.35).

Arias missed the 2010 and 2011 seasons due to injury. On October 24, 2011, he re-signed a minor league contract with the Astros.

External links

1983 births
Living people
Asheville Tourists players
Colorado Rockies players
Colorado Springs Sky Sox players
Dominican Republic expatriate baseball players in the United States
Houston Astros players
Major League Baseball pitchers
Major League Baseball players from the Dominican Republic
Modesto Nuts players
Round Rock Express players
Sportspeople from Santo Domingo
Tulsa Drillers players
Casper Rockies players
Tigres del Licey players